Russian famine may refer to:

Russian famine of 1601–03
Russian famine of 1891–92
Russian famine of 1921–22

See also
Droughts and famines in Russia and the Soviet Union